"Freaky!" is a song by Italian singer Senhit. It was selected to be the entrant for San Marino in the Eurovision Song Contest 2020 on 9 March 2020, after Senhit was internally selected to represent the country.

Background
The song was written by Gianluigi Fazio, Henrik Steen Hansen and Nanna Bottos. It was selected to represent San Marino in the Eurovision Song Contest 2020 in an online vote.

Eurovision Song Contest

After Senhit was internally selected to represent San Marino in the Eurovision Song Contest 2020, an online vote was used to select which song she would perform. On 9 March 2020, it was announced that 'Freaky!' won the selection. On 28 January 2020, a special allocation draw was held which placed each country into one of the two semi-finals, as well as which half of the show they would perform in. San Marino was placed into the second semi-final, to be held on 14 May 2020, and was scheduled to perform in the first half of the show.

References

2020 singles
2020 songs
Eurovision songs of San Marino
Eurovision songs of 2020
Senhit (singer) songs